Aranzi Aronzo is, as described on the official webpage, the combination of Mr. Aranzi and Mr. Aronzo, which releases Japanese-styled crafts books. In reality, Aranzi Aronzo is a company run by Mrs. Saito and Ms. Yomura that produces original goods. Their catch phrase is "cute, strange, cool, silly, a little bit horrible, stupid and comfortable ARANZI ARONZO". The company has created several stores, books, exhibitions, and advertisements and in 2007, some of the books were published in North America by Vertical Inc.

The style of Aranzi Aronzo has been described as kawaii, meaning Japanese cute; using expressive mascots, Aranzi Aronzo has effectively created a colorful cast of characters featured in the books. The Aranzi Aronzo characters have been also put on t-shirts, notebooks, and postcards, to name a few things.

Books
Aranzi Aronzo has produced several books containing images of their projects in often humorous situations, some of which have been released in North America.

The Cute Book
One of the first books to be released in English, The Cute Book was released in hardcover in February 2007. It features dozens of patterns and instructions for making Aranzi Aronzo style crafts. Several characters like The Bad Guy, Pinkie, sprite-kin, sprite, lizard, monkey, usagi, warumono and Grey Kitty appear in the book and can be made from patterns with felt.

The Bad Book
Also released in February 2007 in English, The Bad Book is similar to the first book, but focuses on the darker Aranzi Aronzo characters. These include The Bad Guy, The Liar, and The Thief. Small comics with the characters are featured throughout the book.

Cute Dolls and Fun Dolls
These books, released in October 2007 in North America, explain how to make stuffed animal versions of the Aranzi Aronzo characters. These books use characters like White Rabbit, Brown Bunny, The Bad Guy, and Liar and feature new ones like Silky, the Panda-Bug, and Eyelash Bunny.

Machine Gun
Aranzi Machine Gun was released throughout the summer of 2007 in English in three volumes. These books show off the lives of the Aranzi Aronzo characters and have small crafts at the end of each issue.

Aranzi Cute Stuff

This book included projects such as hairbands, book covers, and bags. It was released March 11, 2008.

See also
"allons-y Alonso!" ("let's go, Alonso!")]

References

External links
English Official Website
Vertical's Scary Cute Aranzi Aronzo Site
Examples of Aranzi crafts

Handicrafts